HMS Eridge was a  destroyer of the Royal Navy. She was launched in 1940 and served during the Second World War.

Service history
At 05:00, she was permanently disabled by a 450mm torpedo fired by the Italian motor torpedo boat MTSM-228. The attack caused five fatalities on board Eridge. 

She was towed to Alexandria by the destroyer , where the destroyer was used as a base ship for the rest of the war and sold for scrapping in October 1946.

References

Publications
 
 English, John (1987). The Hunts: a history of the design, development and careers of the 86 destroyers of this class built for the Royal and Allied Navies during World War II. England: World Ship Society. .

Further reading

External links 

 HMS Eridge (L 68)
 Captain Frank Gregory-Smith - Daily Telegraph obituary

 

Hunt-class destroyers of the Royal Navy
Ships built by Swan Hunter
Ships built on the River Tyne
1940 ships
World War II destroyers of the United Kingdom
Maritime incidents in August 1942